WWOF (103.1 FM) is a radio station in the Tallahassee, Florida, owned by Adams Radio Group.  The station airs a country music format].

The WWOF-FM studios are located at 2222 Old St. Augustine Rd. in Tallahassee, and the transmitter is located near the Killearn area of Tallahassee.

History
The station began broadcasting on May 12, 1976, as WOWD, airing a middle of the road format. In 1978, the station switched to an album rock format and was known as D-103, “The Rock of Tallahassee “. In March 1985, the station became a Top 40/CHR station known as "Z103", competing against WGLF. WTHZ became the dominant Top 40 station for the Tallahassee market right after WGLF switched to album rock in 1988. It was an affiliate of Scott Shannon's Rockin' America Top 30 during its CHR years. The station's call letters changed to WUMX, and flipped to a Hot AC format as "Mix 103.1", in February 1991. The station dropped Hot AC for its current country format in February 1995 and changed their call letters again to WAIB. Their call letters changed again to WWOF in 2010 and became the current "103.1 The Wolf".

References
WWOF official website

Country radio stations in the United States
WOF
Radio stations established in 1976
1976 establishments in Florida